In psychoanalysis, the narcissism of small differences is the idea that the more a relationship or community shares commonalities, the more likely the people in it are to engage in interpersonal feuds and mutual ridicule because of hypersensitivity to minor differences perceived in each other. The term was coined by Sigmund Freud in 1917, based on the earlier work of English anthropologist Ernest Crawley. Crawley theorized that each individual is separated from others by a taboo of personal isolation, which is effectively a narcissism of minor differences.

Usage

The term appeared in Freud's Civilization and Its Discontents (1929–30) in relation to the application of the inborn aggression in man to ethnic (and other) conflicts, a process still considered by Freud, at that point, as a convenient and relatively harmless satisfaction of the inclination to aggression. For Lacanians, the concept clearly related to the sphere of the Imaginary: the narcissism of small differences, which situates envy as the decisive element in issues that involve narcissistic image. American psychiatrist Glen O. Gabbard has suggested that Freud's narcissism of small differences provides a framework to understand that in a loving relationship, there can be a need to find, and even exaggerate, differences in order to preserve a feeling of separateness and self.

It has been pointed out that Jonathan Swift in his 1726 novel Gulliver's Travels described this phenomenon when writing about how two groups entered into a long and vicious war after they disagreed on which was the best end to break an egg.

In terms of postmodernity, Clive Hazell argues that consumer culture has been seen as predicated on the narcissism of small differences to achieve a superficial sense of one's own uniqueness, an ersatz sense of otherness which is only a mask for an underlying uniformity and sameness. The phenomenon has been portrayed by the British comedy group Monty Python in their satirical 1979 film Life of Brian and by author Joan Didion in an essay (part of her 1968 book Slouching Towards Bethlehem) about Michael Laski, the founder of the Communist Party USA (Marxist–Leninist).

In 2010, author Christopher Hitchens cited the phenomenon when talking about ethno-national conflicts. "In numerous cases of apparently ethno-nationalist conflict, the deepest hatreds are manifested between people who—to most outward appearances—exhibit very few significant distinctions."

See also
 Collective narcissism
 Intragroup conflict
 Law of triviality
 Narcissism
 Sectarianism
 The Sneetches and Other Stories by Dr. Seuss

References

Further reading
 An Interview With Freud Biographer Peter D. Kramer by Paul Comstock, April 3, 2007
 Group Psychology and Political Theory, By C. Fred. Alford, pages 40–42, Published 1994, Yale University Press, 
 Michael Ignatieff, "The Narcissism of Minor Difference," in The Warrior's Honor: Ethnic War and the Modern Conscience, pages 34–71 Published 1997, Henry Holt and Co., 
 Anton Blok, 'The Narcissism of Minor Differences' in Honor and Violence (Cambridge 2001) 115-131
 Middle East sectarianism explained: the narcissism of small differences Victor Argo 13 Apr 2015 Your Middle East

Narcissism
Freudian psychology
1917 introductions